Ariyappedatha Rahasyam is a 1981 Indian Malayalam film,  directed by P. Venu and produced by Koshi Ninan, John Philip, Koshi Philip and Raji George. The film stars Prem Nazir, Jayan, Jayabharathi and Jose Prakash in the lead roles. The film has musical score by M. K. Arjunan.

Cast
Prem Nazir as Vijayan
Jayan as Raghu
Jayabharathi as Geetha
Jose Prakash as Sreedharan Thampi
Prameela as Santha
Janardhanan as Pappan
Mala Aravindan as Bobby
N. Govindankutty as Gopi
Alummoodan as Andrews
Kanakadurga as Sarojam
Poojappura Ravi as Paramu
Sadhana as Reetha

Soundtrack
The music was composed by M. K. Arjunan and the lyrics were written by P. Bhaskaran.

References

External links
 

1981 films
1980s Malayalam-language films
Films directed by P. Venu